Bhairavi is a janya rāgam in Carnatic music (musical scale of South Indian classical music). Though it is a sampoorna rāgam (scale having all 7 notes), it has two different dhaivathams in its scale making it a Bhashanga Ragam, and hence is not classified as a melakarta rāgam (parent scale).

This is one of the ancient rāgams, said to have been prevalent about 1500 years ago. There are numerous compositions in this rāgam.

Though a Raga called Bhairavi also exists in Hindusthani music, it is very different from the Carnatic version. Hindustani's Bhairavi, in terms of its aroha and avaroha alone, corresponds to Carnatic music's Thodi.

It is considered a janya of the 20th melakarta Natabhairavi. Its  structure is as follows (see swaras of Carnatic music for details on below notation and terms):
: 
: 

The other set of ārohaṇa and avarohaṇa used is:

: 
: 

The notes used are chathusruthi rishabham, sadharana gandharam, shuddha madhyamam, chathusruthi dhaivatham & shuddha dhaivatham and kaishika nishadham.

While a janya of Natabhairavi melam, Bhairavi takes the anya swaram D2 in the ascent in the phrase P D2 N2 S.  In descent as well as in the phrase P D N D P the D1 of the parent scale is used. Only R2 and M1 can be prolonged without gamakam.  In the ascent G2 is held in conjunction with R2 with short or wide range of oscillation-the later as S G R G M.  The gamakam on G ends in R.  In descent the phrase M P G R is also used and G2 slides from M1 and oscillates.  The phrase S G R G in the ascent and the ending of gamakam on G at R help to avoid flavour of Kharaharapriya which does not use S G R G and in which gamakam on G can end in G itself.  Bhairavi is distinguished from Mukhaari by the use of the phrases P D2 N2 S and S G2 R2 G2 M1. The deft use of gamakams in handling G2 N2 D2 and D1 gives the raagam its flavour.

Elaboration and related ragas

Bhairavi is one of the most popular ragas on the concert stage, due to its very wide scope for improvisation. This raga can be elaborated to beautiful effect in all three sthayis, but shines particularly well in the upper madhya and thara sthayis. The nishada, an important jeeva swara, can be rendered with varying degrees of gamaka, depending on which daivatha is used. The weight of this raga and the lack of vakra sancharas make brighas and slower phrases equally appealing. This characteristic also means that the raga is well-suited to thanam, kanakku, and sarvalaghu swaras. Bhairavi is also one of the most common ragas in which ragam-thanam-pallavi is rendered, due to the scope for elaboration. There is a near-infinite number of compositions in this raga, which can be sung at any time of day. Ragas which have similar murchanas and/or anya swara patterns to Bhairavi include Manji, Mukhari, and Huseni.

Popular compositions

Bhairavi has been decorated with numerous compositions by almost all composers. Viriboni varnam in ata talam by Pacchimiriam Adiyappa is commonly sung at the beginning of a concert and is very popular. Given below are a few very popular compositions among the 100s in this ragam.

Film Songs

Language:Tamil

See also

Notes

References

Janya ragas